Thomas Kwame Aboagye was a Ghanaian lawyer and politician. He was a deputy minister for defence during the second republic, and the member of parliament for the Subin Constituency during the second republic and third republic.

Early life and education
Thomas was born on 4 October 1936 in Kumasi, Ashanti Region, Gold Coast (now Ghana). He had his early education at St.
Cyprian's School in Kumasi and Adisadel College in Cape Coast. He continued at King's College, London, University of London for his bachelor's degree and Fitzwilliam College, Cambridge University for his post graduate degree.

Career and politics
Thomas was called to the bar at Gray's Inn, London.

At the inception of the second republic Thomas contested for the Subin seat on the ticket of the Progress Party and won. Two years later, he was appointed deputy minister for defence. He served in that capacity from 1971 to 1972 when the Busia government was overthrown.

During the era of the SMC he was a member of the People's Movement for Freedom and Justice (PMFJ); a movement that opposed the Unigov (union government) concept of governance that was introduced by General Ignatius Kutu Acheampong and his government. After a referendum that suggested that majority of the Ghanaian populace were in favour of the unigov concept of governance, he together with other members of the People's Movement for Freedom and Justice (PMFJ) had their assets frozen.

In 1979 during the third republic he was once again elected to represent the Subin Constituency in parliament on the ticket of the Popular Front Party; the new name the Progress Party adopted for the 1979 general elections. He served as the member of parliament for Subin until 1981 when the Limann government was overthrown by the Armed Forces Revolutionary Council.

Personal life
He loved playing golf at his leisure times.

See also
 List of MPs elected in the 1969 Ghanaian parliamentary election
 Busia government

References

1936 births
Akan people
People from Kumasi
Ghanaian MPs 1969–1972
Ghanaian MPs 1979–1981
Progress Party (Ghana) politicians
20th-century Ghanaian politicians
Alumni of Adisadel College
Alumni of the University of London
Alumni of the Inns of Court School of Law
Living people
People from Ashanti Region